Storch is a German surname meaning "Stork". Notable people with the surname include:

 Ambrosius Pelargus (c. 1493 – 1561), German Dominican theologian (real last name Storch)
 Anne Storch (born 1968), German linguist
 Anton Storch (1892–1975), German politician
 Arthur Storch (1925–2013), American actor and Broadway director
 Beatrix von Storch (born 1971 as Duchess of Oldenburg), German politician (Alternative for Germany)
 Despina Storch (1894 or 1895 – 1918), Turkish woman alleged to have been a spy for Germany and the Ottoman Empire during World War I
 Eduard Štorch (1878–1956), Czech writer and archaeologist
 Erikka Lynn Storch (born 1971), American politician and Republican member of the West Virginia House of Delegates
 Frederik Storch (1805–1883), Danish genre painter
 Gerald L. Storch, American retail executive, former chairman and CEO of Toys "R" Us
 Hans von Storch (born 1949), German climatologist
 Karl Storch (1913–1992), German hammer thrower and 1952 Olympic silver medalist
 Klaus von Storch (born 1962), Chilean aerospace engineer and astronaut trainee
 Larry Storch (1923–2022), American actor and comedian
 Marcia Storch (1933–1998), American physician and feminist
 Marcus Storch (born 1942), Swedish industrialist and engineer
 Nikolaus Storch (died after 1536), reformation preacher
 Scott Storch (born 1973), American record producer
 Uwe Storch (born 1940), German mathematician
 Wenzel Storch (born 1961), German film director and producer
Surnames from nicknames

German-language surnames